I Want to Know Your Parents is a 2022 South Korean drama film directed by Kim Ji-hoon and written by Gim Gyung-mi. Based on a Japanese theatrical play Oya no Kao ga Mitai by Seigo Hatasawa, the film stars Sol Kyung-gu, Sung Yoo-bin and Chun Woo-hee. The film about school violence revolves around an eighth grade student, who kills himself but not before writing the names of the students who victimized him. And when their parents are called to the school, a battle goes on regarding the will.  It was released theatrically on April 27, 2022.

Cast
 Sol Kyung-gu as Kang Ho-chang, a lawyer and the father of Kang Han-gyeol, a student at a prestigious Haneum International Middle School.
 Sung Yoo-bin as Kang Han-gyeol, student designated as a perpetrator of school violence. 
 Oh Dal-su as Do Ji-yeol 
 Chun Woo-hee as Song Jeong-wook, a homeroom teacher.
 Ko Chang-seok as Teacher Jung
 Moon So-ri as victim's mother
 Kang Shin-il as Principal
 Kim Hong-pa as Park Moo-taek, a former police chief.
 Yoo Jae-sang as Kim Gun-woo
 Jung Yoo-ahn as Do Yoon-jae
 Jung Taek-hyun as Jung Yi-deun
 Yoon Kyung-ho as public prosecutor

Production 
Principal photography began on May 29, 2017 and ended on August 27, 2017, at Tangeum Lake in Chungju, North Chungcheong Province, South Korea. The film was completed in 2018 but the release was postponed indefinitely due to the #MeToo controversy at the time.

Reception

Box office
The film was released on 1007 screens on April 27, 2022. It was placed at no. 2 at the domestic box office on opening day, and the first weekend of its release.

, it has a gross of US$3,091,257 along with 403,569 admissions.

Critical response
Oh Jin-Woo  writing for Cine21 stated that the film looked at school violence from the perpetrator's point of view. Oh criticised the editing and felt that in spite of energetic performance of actors "due to the somewhat loose editing" "fun of the original story is halved." Oh concluded by writing, "Here, all the sets feel too new, so they don't fit the heavy movie theme, which interferes with immersion."

Home media

The film was released on streaming service Disney+ in South Korea on June 1, 2022.

References

External links
  

 
 
 

2022 films
2022 drama films
2020s Korean-language films
2020s South Korean films
South Korean courtroom films
South Korean drama films
South Korean films based on plays
Films about father–son relationships
Films about educators
Films about lawyers
Films about school violence
Films about suicide
Films directed by Kim Ji-hoon
Films set in Seoul
Films set in Gyeonggi Province
Films set in 2017
Middle school films